The 2013–14 Hidalgo La Fiera season was the second season for the professional indoor soccer club but first under the Hidalgo La Fiera branding. (The team is also known as La Fiera FC.) The franchise was founded in 2012 as the Rio Grande Valley Flash. La Fiera, a Central Division team in the Professional Arena Soccer League, played their home games in the State Farm Arena in Hidalgo, Texas.

The team was led by president Joaquín García Fernández and head coach Mariano Bollella. La Fiera completed the regular season with a 14–2 record and the Central Division Championship. In the post-season, they won their way into the PASL Championship match but lost to the Chicago Mustangs 15–4.

Season summary
The season started with an overtime loss on the road versus the expansion Monterrey Flash but La Fiera won their next nine games, including the third shootout in PASL history and two more overtime games. Another road loss (6–11) to Monterrey snapped that streak but a 7–1 win at home over the Flash the next week gave La Fiera a split in the season series and a one-goal lead head-to-head, a critical advantage in determining postseason seeding. The team finished January with two more wins and finished the regular season with a 14–2 record and the top spot in the Central Division.

In the post-season, Hidalgo defeated the Monterrey Flash 9–8 in the Central Division Final at the State Farm Arena. They advanced to the PASL Final Four at the Sears Centre in Chicago where they defeated the Las Vegas Legends 6–5 in the Semi-final match. They faced the Chicago Mustangs on March 16 in the Championship match but lost 15–4.

La Fiera also participated in the 2013–14 United States Open Cup for Arena Soccer, starting with a bye in the Round of 32. Hidalgo's December 29, 2013, regular season 12–9 win over the Dallas Sidekicks also counted as both teams' Round of 16 match, advancing La Fiera to a February 1 Quarter-finals match. Hidalgo defeated Austin FC of the Premier Arena Soccer League 13–2 to advance to the Semi-finals. They defeated Las Vegas Legends 6–5 in a game that doubled as the PASL Semi-final match. They faced the Chicago Mustangs on March 16 in an Open Cup Final that doubled as the PASL championship match and lost 15–4.

History
The team was originally organized in 2011 as the "Monterrey Flash" in the Liga Mexicana de Futbol Rápido Profesional (LMFR). Although successful, the team moved across the border to Texas and joined the PASL as the "Rio Grande Valley Flash" in September 2012. In mid-October 2012, the Flash announced that they had rejoined the LMFR and would participate in both leagues. This move prove short-lived and the team fell into disarray after the 2012–13 PASL season. In July 2013, Victor Fernandez assumed ownership of the team and reorganized it as "La Fiera FC" with a new logo and colors. In late July, Joaquín García Fernández was announced as team president.

Off-field moves
Legendary Mexican soccer player Cuauhtémoc Blanco was honored by the team on November 17, during the match against Saltillo Rancho Seco.

Awards and honors
On February 26, 2014, the PASL announced its "All-League" honors. Goalkeeper Juan Gamboa was one of six players named to the All-League First Team.

Schedule

Regular season

† Game also counts for US Open Cup, as listed in chart below.

Post-season

† Game also counts for US Open Cup, as listed in chart below.

U.S. Open Cup for Arena Soccer

References

External links 

Hidalgo La Fiera official website
Hidalgo La Fiera at The Brownsville Herald
Golazo Soccer official website

Hidalgo La Fiera
Hidalgo La Fiera
Hidalgo La Fiera 2013
Hidalgo La Fiera 2013
Hidalgo La Fiera 2013